The Research Policy Institute at Lund University, Lund, Sweden, is an academic research institute devoted to studies of science, technology and society. Founded in 1966 by Stevan Dedijer, the institute is nowadays a part of Lund School of Economics and Management. The institute's research program is divided on three main areas: "Research policy, and the dynamics of scientific fields", "Knowledge and innovation for development", and "Studies of risks and risk management (including social intelligence)". It has a newly started doctoral programme in research policy, which is the first in the specific field in Sweden.

References

External links 
 Research Policy Institute homepage
 Lund University homepage

Lund University